Kevin Bastián Staling Hidalgo Silva (born 29 July 1995) is a Chilean footballer who plays for Lautaro de Buin in the Segunda División Profesional de Chile.

References

External links
 

1995 births
Living people
People from Talcahuano
Chilean footballers
Chilean Primera División players
Primera B de Chile players
Segunda División Profesional de Chile players
C.D. Huachipato footballers
Ñublense footballers
C.D. Arturo Fernández Vial footballers
Deportes Iquique footballers
Lautaro de Buin footballers
Association football defenders